Marin Šestak (born 30 June 1991) is a Croatian retired football defender, who spent a few seasons in the Austrian lower leagues.

References

External links
 
Marin Šestak at Sportnet.hr 

1991 births
Living people
Sportspeople from Koprivnica
Association football central defenders
Croatian footballers
NK Slaven Belupo players
NK Koprivnica players
Croatian Football League players
Austrian 2. Landesliga players
Croatian expatriate footballers
Expatriate footballers in Austria
Croatian expatriate sportspeople in Austria